Buggs is a surname. Notable people with the surname include:

Danny Buggs (born 1953), American football player
Isaiah Buggs (born 1997), American football player
Marcus Buggs (born 1985), American football player

See also
Bugg (surname)